Surya Sikha is a Bengali romance drama film directed by Salil Dutta. This film was released on 12 July 1963 in the banner of Chhayachhabi Pratisthan. The film starring Uttam Kumar Supriya Debi in lead role and Chabi Biswas, Utpal Dutta and others played supporting role.

Plot
Dipto Roy returns to India after completion of FRCS from London. He is extremely committed and dutyfull to his patients. He takes up the responsibility to run a village hospital and makes a lot of changes to the infrastructure which causes serious oppositions to him. Achena, a schoolteacher having nursing training assists him.  Dipto and Achena marry but after the marriage Achena becomes more active in housework rather than the hospital which makes Dipto frustrated. Subsequently, they separate and after many years Dipta and Achena meet once again.

Cast
 Uttam Kumar as Dipto
 Supriya Devi as Achena
 Chhabi Biswas
 Utpal Dutt
 Tarun Kumar Chatterjee
 Jahor Roy
 Asit Baran
 Panchanan Bhattacharya
 Arati Das
 Gangapada Basu
 Shailen Mukherjee
 Dhiraj Das
 Parijat Bose

Soundtrack

References

External links
 

1963 films
Bengali-language Indian films
1960s Bengali-language films
Films directed by Salil Dutta
Indian romance films